5-Hour Energy was a UCI Continental cycling team founded in 2009 in the United States.

After the loss of their title sponsor in December 2014, the team disbanded.

Final roster

Major wins
2011
Stage 2 Tour of Elk Grove, Robert Sweeting
2013
Stage 5 Tour of the Gila, Francisco Mancebo
Stage 3 Tour de Beauce, Francisco Mancebo
Stage 6 The Larry H. Miller Tour of Utah, Francisco Mancebo

References

Defunct cycling teams based in the United States
UCI Continental Teams (America)
Cycling teams established in 2009
Cycling teams disestablished in 2014
2009 establishments in the United States
2014 disestablishments in the United States